This is a partial list of people who lived in Goguryeo from 37 BCE-668 CE and those of Goguryeo descent.

Rulers
Goguryeo (37 BC - 668 CE) was one of the Three Kingdoms of Korea. Goguryeo rulers may have used the title of Taewang (太王, "Greatest King").

Royal family
So Seo-no
Anseung
Go Deokmu
Pyeonggang
Go Deokmu

Political leaders
Myeongnim Dap-bu
Eul Paso
Go Uru
Myeongnim Eosu
Eum-u
Sang-nu
Chang Jo-ri
Wang San-ak
Yeon Ja-yu
Yeon Taejo

Military leaders
Yu Yu
Mil U
Yu Ok-gu
Go Noja
Gal Ro
Dae Jo Yeong
Maeng Gwang
On Dal
Eulji Mundeok
Gang Yi-sik
Yeon Gaesomun
Yeon Nam-geon
Yeon Nam-saeng
Yang Man-chun
Go Yeon-mu
Geom Mojam
Bu Wiyeom

Buddhist monks
Dorim
Uiyeon
Damjing
Hyechong
Eji
Hyegwan
Bodeok

Other
Go Un
Yi Jeonggi
Yi Nab 
Yi Sago
Yi Sado
Go Seonji

See also
List of Silla people
List of Baekje people
List of Goryeo people
List of Joseon people
List of Koreans

 
Goguryeo
Goguryeo